Eram is a small village in Basudevpur, Bhadrak from Odisha. It plays an important role in the history of Indian Independence movement. It is also known as Rakta Tirtha Eram (The Pilgrim of Blood) and the second Jallianwala Bagh of India.

Geography 
Eram is located in Bhadrak district of Odisha and is 8 km away from Basudebpur village of Bhadrak district.

Role in Indian Independence Movement 
The village Eram was remote, inaccessible and far from cities, surrounded by the Bay of Bengal and two rivers Gamoi and Kansbans and thick jungles the place was sleepy and silent to reach.  From 1920, Eram was a secret place for Utkal Congress meetings, Gopabandhu Das, Harekrushna Mahatab and other Congress leaders used Eram as a place for public meetings to share the messages about Quit India Movement or Non-cooperation Movement of  Mahatma Gandhi and to propagate the Gandhian ideals of freedom struggle among the villagers.

1942 Mass attack incident 
On 28 September 1942 there was a huge gathering at that place to protest against British Raj and to prepare a course plan of action to  fight against British. Under the leadership of Kamala Prasad Kar a crowd of 5000 people gathered at Eram Melana ground. Afraid of this gathering a police force from Basudebpur police station, led by DSP Kunjabihari Mohanty march towards Eram. As like Jaliyanawala Bagh here, DSP Kunjabihari Mohanty acted as General Dyer and opened fire on the huge gathering at 6:30 PM, within few minutes 304 shots were discharged against the crowd, who were performing the agitation against the British rulers in a peaceful way. Since the field was bounded on three sides, therefore, no one was able to get escape from the field. Within some minutes 29 persons were dead on the spot and 56 were injured. Among the dead of Eram massacre includes one woman named Pari Bewa, who is regarded as the only lady martyr of Odisha.  For this incident, Eram  is popularly known as Rakta Tirtha Eram (The Pilgrim of Blood).

Martyrs list 
 Pari Bewa, Eram, Basudebpur 
 Gopal Chandra Das, Padhnuan 
 Bishwanath Das, Padhuan  
 Bijuli Das, Padhuan 
 Hrushikesh Behera, Padhuan 
 Madan Palai, Padhuan 
 Ballahaba Behera, Padhuan 
 Magha Mahalika, Padhuan  
 Bhua Majhi, Padhuan  
 Kali Ajhi, Padhuan-Kumarpur
 Radhu Ahalika, Padhuan-Muladiha
 Dhruba Charana Dey, Padhuan 
 Basudeb Sahu, Padhuan 
 Hari Behera, Padhuan 
 Dibakar Panigrahi, Guda-Kesagadia 
 Krushna Chandra Swain, Padhuan-Kumarpur
 Bhaban Rout, Padhuan-Nandapura 
 Nidhi Mahalika, Padhuan 
 Brundaban Panda, Padhuan 
 Upa Mallika, Nuangan 
 Krupasindhu Behera, Sankharu 
 Rama Majhi, Padhuan-Kumarpur 
 Mani Behera, Padhuan  
 Kati Sahu, Iswarapur 
 Ratnakar Pani, Sudarsanpur 
 Mani Pradhana, Suan-Sudarsanpur 
 Pari Das, Suan 
 Sankar Mallika, Adhunan 
 Gobinda Rout, Artungan
Panu Dash, Nuagaon

In the memory of Martyrs, A martyrs’ memorial was built in Eram. It is one of the tourism places in Odisha.

References

Tourism in Odisha
Bhadrak district
History of Odisha
Indian independence movement
1942 in India